The 2021–22 UNC Greensboro Spartans men's basketball team represented the University of North Carolina at Greensboro during the 2021–22 NCAA Division I men's basketball season. The Spartans, led by first-year head coach Mike Jones, played their home games at the Greensboro Coliseum and Fleming Gymnasium in Greensboro, North Carolina as members of the Southern Conference (SoCon). They finished the season 17–14, 9–9 in SoCon play to finish in a tie for fifth place. As the No. 6 seed in the SoCon tournament, they lost to Samford in the quarterfinals. Guard De'Monte Buckingham was named to the Southern Conference Sports Media Association third team. They accepted an invitation to play in the 2022 College Basketball Invitational tournament where, as a No. 7 seed, they lost to No. 10-seeded Boston University in the first round.

Previous season 
In a season limited due to the ongoing COVID-19 pandemic, the Spartans finished the 2020–21 season 21–9, 13–5 in SoCon play to win the regular season championship. They went on to win the SoCon tournament, defeating Mercer in the final, and receiving the automatic berth to the 2021 NCAA Division I men's basketball tournament, where they lost in the Round of 64 to Florida State. 

Guard Isaiah Miller was named Southern Conference Men's Basketball Player of the Year for the second consecutive year, the first men's player to do so since Stephen Curry. He was also named conference Defensive Player of the Year and named to the All-Southern Conference first-team for a third consecutive season.

Offseason 

Following the 2020-21 season, head coach Wes Miller left UNCG to take the position of head men's basketball coach at Cincinnati. 

On April 19, 2021, Mike Jones, previously of Radford, was hired to be the new head men's basketball coach.

Nine players entered the transfer portal with graduate student Hayden Koval and sophomores Jarrett Hensley and A.J. McGinnis, along with assistant coach Chris LePore, electing to join Miller at Cincinnati. Senior Kaleb Hunter and junior Bas Leyte withdrew from the transfer portal and chose to stay at UNCG.

The Spartans mitigated those transfer losses with transfers of their own, bringing in Graduate Student De'Monte Buckingham from Cal State-Bakersfield, Senior Dante Treacy from Robert Morris, and Junior Jalen White from Texas A&M-Corpus Christi, all of whom were expected to make an impact on Mike Jones's team.

Departing players

Incoming transfers

Roster

Schedule and results 

|-
!colspan=9 style=| Non-conference regular season 

|-
!colspan=12 style=|<span style=>SoCon Regular Season

|-
!colspan=9 style=| SoCon tournament

|-
!colspan=9 style=| CBI tournament

Awards and honors

Southern Conference honors

SoCon Sports Media Association Third Team
De'Monte Buckingham

References 

UNC Greensboro Spartans men's basketball seasons
UNC Greensboro
UNC Greensboro Spartans men's basketball
UNC Greensboro Spartans men's basketball
UNC Greensboro